Paradox is a 2018 American musical film written and directed by Daryl Hannah, and starring Neil Young and his current backing band Promise of the Real. A soundtrack album, Paradox, by Young and the band was released to coincide with the film.

Plot 
A band of outlaws hide high up in the Mountains. The group pass the hours searching for treasure while they wait for the full moon to lend its magic, bring the music and make the spirits fly.

Cast
Neil Young as “The Man in the Black Hat“
Lukas Nelson as “Jail Time”
Micah Nelson as “Particle Kid”
Corey McCormick as Cookie McCormick
Anthony LoGerfo as Happy
Tato Melgar as Tato
Willie Nelson as Red
Elliot Roberts as Cowboy Elliot
Hilary Shepard as Lady
Dave Snowbear Toms as Snowbear
Charris Ford as Weed

Release
The film premiered at the 2018 South by Southwest festival on March 15, 2018. It then debuted on Netflix worldwide on March 23, 2018.

Reception
On Metacritic, the film has a weighted average score of 31 out of 100, based on 4 critics, indicating "generally unfavorable reviews".

References

External links
 

English-language Netflix original films
American musical films
2010s musical films
Films directed by Daryl Hannah
2010s English-language films
2010s American films